HMS Jupiter was a 50-gun Portland-class fourth-rate ship of the Royal Navy. She served during the American War of Independence, the French Revolutionary Wars, and the Napoleonic Wars in a career that spanned thirty years. She was also one of the fastest ships in the Royal Navy as shown by her attempt to capture the cutter Eclipse under Nathaniel Fanning.

Construction
Built in Rotherhithe, Jupiter was launched in 1778. Her trial copper sheathed hull featured the new technical breakthrough of protecting her iron bolts by the application of thick paper between the copper plates and the hull. This innovation she trialled successfully.

Service history
On 20 October 1778, Jupiter, together with the frigate  fought an indecisive action with the 64-gun French . Jupiter lost 3 killed with 7 men wounded. On 1 April 1779, under the command of Francis Reynolds, Jupiter assisted  after Delight captured the French 20-gun privateer Jean Bart.

On 2 October 1779, Jupiter captured two French cutters, each of 14 guns and 120 men. The Royal Navy took both into service essentially under their existing names. One was Mutin, under the command of Chevalier de Roquefeiul. She was pierced for 16 guns but carried 14, either 4 or 6-pounders. The other was Pilote, under the command of Chevalier de Clonard. She carried the same armament as Mutine (or Mutin). The cutters surrendered after an engagement that left Mutin dismasted. Jupiter fought at the battle of Porto Praya in 1781.

On 28 March 1795, Princess Caroline of Brunswick and James Harris, 1st Earl of Malmesbury left Cuxhaven on the Jupiter en route to London. Delayed by poor weather, they arrived a week later, on Easter Sunday, 5 April.

Jupiter fought at the Battle of Muizenberg in 1795, winning the battle honour 'Cape of Good Hope' for the latter. In 1799 Jupiter battled a French frigate in the aftermath of the Battle of Algoa Bay.

On 25 April 1799 Jupiter, and  recaptured  as she lay at anchor under the guns of the battery at Connonies-Point, Île de France. The French frigate  had captured Chance, which was carrying a cargo of rice, in Balasore Roads. The squadron also recaptured another ship that a French privateer had captured in the Bay of Bengal. Lastly, after the French had driven the American ship Pacific onshore at River Noir, Jupiter, and  came on the scene and sent in their boats, which removed much of Pacifics cargo of bale goods and sugar. The British then set Pacific on fire.

They had arrived there on 1 August. Captain George Losack, of Jupiter, decided to accompany the convoy eastward until they were unlikely to encounter some Spanish and French vessels known to be cruising off Brazil.

On 27 February 1806, an accidental fire broke out aboard Jupiter while she was at Port Royal, Jamaica. She was scuttled to extinguish the fire. She was subsequently refloated, repaired, and returned to service.

On 18 April 1807 she sailed from Portsmouth as escort to a fleet of East Indiamen bound for India and China, though she would not accompany them all the way. On 15 June they were at  "all well". However,  had become leaky and it was determined that she should go into a port.

Fate
Jupiter was wrecked on 10 December 1808 in Vigo Bay on the coast of Spain, but all her crew were saved. A transport was lost there at about the same time.

Captain the Honourable Henry Barker approached Vigo Harbour towards the end of dusk. He decided to anchor as close to the harbour as possible in order to be able to come in early the next morning. As she was coming into position she hit a reef. Attempts to lighten her by throwing shot and stores overboard had no effect, and she was taking on so much water the fear was that if she were heaved off she would sink. Over the next two days stores were removed. She then fell on her starboard side and was left a wreck. The subsequent court martial admonished Captain Barker to be more careful in the future.

Citations

References
 
 
 
 
 hmsjupiter.co.uk

External links
 

1778 ships
Ships of the line of the Royal Navy
Ships built in Rotherhithe
Maritime incidents in 1806
Maritime incidents in 1808
Ship fires
Scuttled vessels
Shipwrecks in the Caribbean Sea
Shipwrecks of Spain
Caroline of Brunswick